Kyron Silveria Gordon (born 24 May 2002) is an English professional footballer who plays as a defender for Sheffield United.

Early and personal life
Gordon is the younger brother of fellow footballer Tyler Smith, the two making their debut for Sheffield United alongside each other.

Career
On 10 August 2021, Gordon made his senior debut for Sheffield United in an EFL Cup victory over Carlisle United. In November 2021, Gordon joined National League North club Boston United on loan, being recalled in January in order to feature in the FA Cup against Wolverhampton Wanderers, talking of the importance of the loan spell in aiding his development. His league debut came on 26 February in a 1–0 defeat to Millwall. At the end of the 2021–22 season, Gordon signed a new contract with the club. 

On 11 November 2022, Gordon joined National League club Boreham Wood on loan.

Career statistics

References

2002 births
Living people
English footballers
Association football defenders
Sheffield United F.C. players
Boston United F.C. players
Boreham Wood F.C. players
National League (English football) players
English Football League players